The Upemba Depression (or Kamalondo Depression) is a large marshy bowl area (depression) in the Democratic Republic of the Congo comprising some fifty lakes, including 22 of relatively large size including Lake Upemba (530 km) and Lake Kisale (300 km). In an earlier era, the area was probably occupied by one large lake.

The area is covered in marshland and is partially within the Upemba National Park in Haut-Lomami District. The Upemba Depression has been populated almost continuously since the 5th century AD, and is considered the origin of the Kingdom of Luba (1585-1889).  Chronology based on more than 55 radiocarbon datings and thermoluminescence shows periods of occupation since the Stone Age. The area includes many archaeological sites and is on the tentative list for UNESCO World Heritage Site. Roughly translated, the citation for its inclusion as World Heritage Site states:This large depression has delivered the largest known cemetery in  sub-Saharan Africa. Over 40 archaeological sites have been identified, but only six have been partially excavated so far. Their study allows tracing the complete sequence of the occupation of the region over two millennia, and thus reconstructing the history of a major ethnic group of Central Africa: the Luba.

Major lakes

 Lake Kabamba
 Lake Kabele
 Lake Kabwe
 Lake Kange
 Lake Kibala
 Lake Kisale
 Lake Kalondo
 Lake Kapondwe
 Lake Kasala
 Lake Kayumba
 Lake Kiubo
 Lake Lukonga
 Lake Lunde
 Lake Mulenda
 Lake Muyumbwe
 Lake Noala
 Lake Sanwa
 Lake Songwe
 Lake Tungwe
 Lake Upemba
 Lake Zimbambo

References

Depressions (geology)
Landforms of the Democratic Republic of the Congo
Basins of Africa
Haut-Lomami
Geology of the Democratic Republic of the Congo